Theater Krefeld und Mönchengladbach gGmbH is a daughter company of the German cities Krefeld and Mönchengladbach to organize and offer theater play, music show and ballet at local places. Spoken language is German. The staff is a permanent ensemble.

Venues

External links
 http://theater-kr-mg.de/, official website
 https://www.shakespeare-festival.de/en/, official website

Theatre companies in Germany